Maurice Monnot was a French sailor who represented his country at the 1900 Summer Olympics in Meulan, France. Monnot as helmsman took the 4th place in first race of the 0 to 0.5 ton and finished 5th in the second race.

Further reading

References

External links

 

French male sailors (sport)
Sailors at the 1900 Summer Olympics – 0 to .5 ton
Olympic sailors of France
Year of birth missing
Year of death missing
Place of birth missing
Sailors at the 1900 Summer Olympics – Open class